Al Hoxie (1901–1982) was an American film actor. The younger brother of Jack Hoxie, he starred in a number of silent westerns.

Selected filmography
 Ruth of the Rockies''' (1920)
 Thunderbolt Jack (1920)
 The Queen of Sheba (1921)
 The Red Warning (1923) 
 The Hunchback of Notre Dame (1923)
 The Back Trail (1924)
 Days of '49 (1924)
 Ace of Clubs (1925)
 Red Blood (1925)
 Riding Romance (1925)
 Ridin' Thunder (1925)
 Unseen Enemies (1925)
 The Texas Terror (1925)
 The Road Agent (1925)
 Tumbleweeds (1925)
 Blue Streak O'Neil (1926)
 Rider of the Law (1927)
 His Last Bullet (1928)
 The White Outlaw (1929)

References

Bibliography
 Katchmer, George A. A Biographical Dictionary of Silent Film Western Actors and Actresses''. McFarland, 2015.

External links

1901 births
1982 deaths
American male film actors
People from Nez Perce County, Idaho
Male actors from Idaho